Lentiai is a comune (municipality) in the province of Belluno in the Italian region of Veneto, located about  northwest of Venice and about  southwest of Belluno.

Lentiai borders the following municipalities: Cesiomaggiore, Feltre, Mel, Santa Giustina, Valdobbiadene, Vas.

Demographic evolution

References 

Cities and towns in Veneto